Marcel Silva Sacramento (born August 24, 1987 in Vera Cruz, Bahia) is a Brazilian footballer who plays for Afogados FC.

Early life 
Sacramento began his career with the juvenile team of Esporte Clube Bahia, where as a striker he was top scorer of the juniors. He played for Avine Cardoso Júnior and Bruno César among others.

Career 
When he was promoted to professional staff of Bahia, he was loaned to Albirex Niigata, Japan. Sacramento returned to Brazil to act again in Esporte Clube Bahia, now as a starter. From Bahia he moved was to Ceará Sporting Club, where he stood out and was loaned to Boavista Sport Club and then sold to Jönköping Södra of Sweden.

References 

Living people
1987 births
Brazilian footballers
Brazilian expatriate footballers
Albirex Niigata players
Kalmar FF players
América Futebol Clube (RN) players
Ceará Sporting Club players
Esporte Clube Bahia players
Jönköpings Södra IF players
Guarany Sporting Club players
Esporte Clube Jacuipense players
Semen Padang F.C. players
Persipura Jayapura players
PS Barito Putera players
Globo Futebol Clube players
Erbil SC players
TRAU FC players
Allsvenskan players
Superettan players
J1 League players
I-League players
Liga 1 (Indonesia) players
Campeonato Brasileiro Série B players
Campeonato Brasileiro Série C players
Campeonato Brasileiro Série D players
Association football forwards
Expatriate footballers in Sweden
Expatriate footballers in Japan
Expatriate footballers in Indonesia
Expatriate footballers in Iraq
Expatriate footballers in India
Brazilian expatriate sportspeople in Sweden
Brazilian expatriate sportspeople in Japan
Brazilian expatriate sportspeople in Indonesia
Brazilian expatriate sportspeople in Iraq
Brazilian expatriate sportspeople in India